The Constitution of the Moldavian Soviet Socialist Republic (1941) was the fundamental law of the Moldovan SSR, adopted in 1941.

History 

The Constitution of 1941 was adopted soon after the 1941 Moldavian SSR elections. The Constitution was adopted at the first session of the Supreme Soviet of the Moldavian SSR, on February 10, 1941. It was based on the principles and provisions of the 1936 Soviet Constitution. 

Moldovan deputies represented 56% of the total number of representatives, although the titular ethnicity made up 65% of the republic's population.

The Constitution was superseded by a new one in 1978

External links
 George Cioranescu and Rene de Flers, "The New Constitution of the Moldavian Soviet Socialist Republic", 1978-6-28

Sources

 

Moldova
1941 in the Moldavian Soviet Socialist Republic
1941 in law
1941 documents
Moldavian Soviet Socialist Republic
Modavian